Pearson is an unincorporated community in the town of Ainsworth, Langlade County, Wisconsin, United States. The community is situated on Pickerel Creek near its confluence with the Wolf River. County Highway T runs through Pearson; the closest state highway to the community is Wisconsin State Highway 55 in Pickerel. Pearson had a post office, which closed on May 4, 1996; ZIP code 54462 still serves the community. The Northeast Illinois Council of the Boy Scouts of America runs a summer camp, Ma-Ka-Ja-Wan Scout Reservation, in Pearson.

References

Unincorporated communities in Wisconsin
Unincorporated communities in Langlade County, Wisconsin